Hasanabad-e Qush Bolagh (romanized as Ḩasanābād-e Qūsh Bolāgh and Hasanābād-e Qūsh Bolāgh; also known as Ḩasanābād-e Qeshlaq, Ḩasanābād-e Qoshbolāgh, and Ḩoseynābād-e Qosh Bolāgh) is a village in theAlmahdi Rural District, Jowkar District, Malayer County, Hamadan Province, Iran. According to the 2006 census, its population was 233, with 58 families.

References 

Populated places in Malayer County